James H. Fields (June 26, 1920 – June 17, 1970) was a United States Army captain and a recipient of the United States military's highest decoration for valor—the Medal of Honor—for his actions in France during World War II.

Biography
Fields was born in Caddo, Texas on June 26, 1920. He graduated from the first graduating class from Mirabeau Lamar High School in Houston, Texas in 1939. He attended the University of Oklahoma before he was drafted into the U.S. Army from Houston in February 1942, and by September 27, 1944 was serving as a first lieutenant and a platoon commander in Company A, 10th Armored Infantry Battalion (redesignated from the 10th Armored Infantry Regiment in September 1943), 4th Armored Division.

On September 27, 1944, he led the first platoon of Company A, located on top of Hill 265 near Rechicourt, France, for a counterattack on enemy positions the next morning. That night, when he heard German voices, he told his platoon to dig in. In the morning, his platoon became pinned down by withering crossfire from two machine guns and the threat of a German tank. During the battle, half of the platoon became casualties. Calls over the radio to his unit's anti-tank officer went unanswered. Some of Fields' men wished to surrender because of the hopeless situation, and he replied "I would rather die than surrender." In the ensuing battle, he instructed his only medic not to move; no sooner had he had given the order, the medic abandoned his position and was shot dead. As Fields described the situation, "The medic was five pounds heavier with lead when he fell." Fields picked up a pistol to attempt to save the medic, and while doing so was shot through the face, knocking out several teeth and almost severing his tongue. Undeterred, Fields obtained some gauze and wedged it in his mouth to limit the bleeding. He then picked up a .30 caliber machine gun, and firing from the hip, was able to silence both enemy machine guns. He then began giving orders for a counterattack. The men regained their courage and were able to repel the enemy. Fields refused to be evacuated until he reported his position and the strength of the enemy. After reporting, injured as he was, he found the officer who didn't answer his calls and pummeled him. Fields was awarded the Medal of Honor five months later, on February 27, 1945.

James H. Fields was the first person decorated in the field with the Medal of Honor by General George S. Patton Jr., and was promoted to captain. After Fields received his Medal of Honor, General Patton sent Fields back to the United States. General Patton stated in his memoir "War as I Knew It," "I told Gaffey I did not want Lieutenant Fields sent to the front again, because it has been my unfortunate observation that whenever a man gets the Medal of Honor or even the Distinguished Service Cross, he usually attempts to outdo himself and gets killed, whereas, in order to produce a virile race, such men should be kept alive."

After the war, he became an independent oil operator in Texas, married, and had four children. He died on June 17, 1970 at age 49. He was buried on June 20 in the Houston National Cemetery, in Houston, Texas.

Awards and decorations

Field's military awards include:

  Combat Infantryman Badge

Medal of Honor citation
Fields' Medal of Honor citation reads:

For conspicuous gallantry and intrepidity at risk of life above and beyond the call of duty, at Rechicourt, France. On September 27, 1944, during a sharp action with the enemy infantry and tank forces, 1st Lt. Fields personally led his platoon in a counterattack on the enemy position. Although his platoon had been seriously depleted, the zeal and fervor of his leadership was such as to inspire his small force to accomplish their mission in the face of overwhelming enemy opposition. Seeing that one of the men had been wounded, he left his slit trench and with complete disregard for his personal safety attended the wounded man and administered first aid. While returning to his slit trench he was seriously wounded by a shell burst, the fragments of which cut through his face and head, tearing his teeth, gums, and nasal passage. Although rendered speechless by his wounds, 1st Lt. Fields refused to be evacuated and continued to lead his platoon by the use of hand signals. On one occasion, when two enemy machineguns had a portion of his unit under deadly crossfire, he left his hole, wounded as he was, ran to a light machinegun, whose crew had been knocked out, picked up the gun, and fired it from his hip with such deadly accuracy that both the enemy gun positions were silenced. His action so impressed his men that they found new courage to take up the fire fight, increasing their firepower, and exposing themselves more than ever to harass the enemy with additional bazooka and machinegun fire. Only when his objective had been taken and the enemy scattered did 1st Lt. Fields consent to be evacuated to the battalion command post. At this point he refused to move further back until he had explained to his battalion commander by drawing on paper the position of his men and the disposition of the enemy forces. The dauntless and gallant heroism displayed by 1st Lt. Fields were largely responsible for the repulse of the enemy forces and contributed in a large measure to the successful capture of his battalion objective during this action. His eagerness and determination to close with the enemy and to destroy him was an inspiration to the entire command, and are in the highest traditions of the U.S. Armed Forces.

See also

List of Medal of Honor recipients
List of Medal of Honor recipients for World War II

References

"War As I Knew It" by General George S. Patton, Jr. Pages: 245-246

External links

1920 births
1970 deaths
Place of death missing
United States Army personnel of World War II
United States Army Medal of Honor recipients
Military personnel from Houston
Lamar High School (Houston, Texas) alumni
United States Army officers
Burials at Houston National Cemetery
Recipients of the Silver Star
World War II recipients of the Medal of Honor